The Olivia Tremor Control/The Black Swan Network is an LP released by The Olivia Tremor Control. Within some of these tracks are extracts from The Black Swan Network's dream appeal — taped audio contributions from fans of dreams they've had or would like to have. Also known as the Tour EP or Olivia Tremor Control Vs. Black Swan Network, Flydaddy labelled the record without the band's permission. The band have always called it "Color Squares.

Track listing 
 Introduction, Theme From Airplane Avenue, Flags of Symphony Swan Response, Morning Drones, Neuron Trains Backfire, Tape Splice Prelude, 1, 2, 3, 4 — 18:20
 (Tape Composition), Evening Drones, Dusk at Cubist Castle Closing Theme — 22:36

References

External links
Pitchfork Media review of The Tour (EP)

The Olivia Tremor Control albums
Split albums
1997 albums